YMCA Football Club was an Irish football club based in Belfast, formed by the members of the Belfast YMCA. It was founded in 1883 and competed as a senior club in the Irish Cup. Its best season was 1888-89, when the club reached the final of both the Irish Cup and the first County Antrim Shield, losing to Distillery on both occasions. The club also competed that season in the 1888-89 FA Cup. Later in 1889, however, the club folded, with most players joining Cliftonville, in what was described as an "amalgamation". In 1891, however, the YMCA Athletic Club acquired the Enfield ground on the Crumlin Road with a view to reviving the football team for the 1891-92 season. The revival was not a success, however, and the team, bottom of the league, resigned before Christmas. The club appears to have folded in 1892.

References

Association football clubs established in 1883
Association football clubs established in 1891
Association football clubs disestablished in 1892
Defunct association football clubs in Northern Ireland
Defunct Irish Football League clubs
Association football clubs in Belfast
1883 establishments in Ireland
1892 disestablishments in Ireland
Former senior Irish Football League clubs
Bel